The final of the 1979 ICC Cricket World Cup was played in Lord's, London on 23 June. This was the second time that Lord's had hosted an ICC Cricket World Cup final. The match was won by the West Indies when they defeated England by 92 runs to lift the trophy.

Background
The match was the second consecutive World Cup final hosted at Lord's, following the inaugural 1975 final.

West Indies reached a second consecutive final after defeating Pakistan by 43 runs in the semi-final. Previously, they had won the 1975 final.

England was making their first appearance at a World Cup final after defeating New Zealand by 9 runs in the semi-finals. This was also the first appearance by a European nation at a World Cup final.

Bob Willis, England's leading bowler, missed the final after being injured in the semi-final.

Match Report
England won the toss and chose to field first. The West Indies got off to a bad start, falling to 99/4 with the loss of Greenidge, Haynes, Kallicharan, and captain Clive Lloyd. However, Vivian Richards (138 from 157 balls, 11 fours, 3 sixes) and Collis King (86 from 66 balls, 10 fours, 3 sixes) consolidated the innings. King especially ripped through the English bowling, with a strike rate of 130.3. The West Indies were already at 5/238 when the 139 run partnership ended with the loss of Collis King. Vivian Richards and the tail then took the West Indies to a very imposing total of 286 (9 wickets, 60 overs).

The English batsmen got off to a good start. But the openers, Mike Brearley (64 from 130 balls, 7 fours) and Geoff Boycott (57 from 105 balls, 3 fours) scored very slowly. They put together a very methodical opening partnership of 129 runs in 38 overs, playing as if the match were a five-day Test. By the time both batsmen were out, the run rate had risen too high. Graham Gooch played some hefty strokes in scoring his 32, taking England to 183/2. However, the loss of Derek Randall triggered the most devastating collapse in World Cup history, as England lost 8 wickets for 11 runs. They were eventually all out for 194 in 51 overs.
Vivian Richards was declared Man of the Match.

Complete Scorecard 

Fall of wickets: 1-22 (Greenidge), 2-36 (Haynes), 3-55 (Kallicharran), 4-99 (Lloyd), 5-238 (King), 6-252 (Murray), 7-258 (Roberts), 8-260 (Garner), 9-272 (Holding)

Fall of wickets: 1-129 (Brearley), 2-135 (Boycott), 3-183 (Randall), 4-183 (Gooch), 5-186 (Gower), 6-186 (Larkins), 7-192 (Botham), 8-192 (Old), 9-194 (Taylor), 10-194 (Hendrick)

See also

 ICC Cricket World Cup

References

External links
 Cricket World Cup 1979 from Cricinfo

International sports competitions in London
Cricket World Cup Final, 1979
International cricket competitions from 1975–76 to 1980
Final, 1979 Cricket World Cup
1979 in English cricket
Cricket World Cup Finals
Lord's
Cricket in London